1971: Beyond Borders is a 2017 Indian Malayalam-language war film written and directed by Major Ravi. It is the fourth installment in the Major Mahadevan film series, with Mohanlal reprising his role as Colonel Mahadevan and a new character, Major Sahadevan. It also features Arunoday Singh and Allu Sirish. The film, set in two time periods, is based on the Indo-Pakistani War of 1971 and act as both prequel and follow-up to the series. Mohanlal's and Sirish's characters were modeled on Hoshiar Singh Dahiya and Arun Khetarpal, both of whom were awarded the Param Vir Chakra for their roles in the 1971 Indo-Pakistani War.

Dialogues were written by Shiju Nambyath for the script of Ravi. The film was shot by Sujith Vaassudev, while Gopi Sunder provided the score. Siddharth Vipin, Najim Arshad, and Rahul Subramanian composed the soundtrack. Principal photography commenced on 31 October 2016 in Suratgarh, Rajasthan and completed on 5 February 2017 in Georgia. 1971: Beyond Borders released on 7 April 2017 in India.

Plot
The film starts in Georgia where a Pakistani UN Peace Keeping Forces reaches a building where Gangsters are hiding. As the counter insurgency operation begins, the insurgents open fire. The team is stuck in cross firing and calls for reinforcements. At that time, an Indian UN Peace Keeping Forces reaches there and rescues the contingent. The leader of the contingent is Colonel Mahadevan. He meets the leader of the Pakistani contingent, whose name is Col. Ajmal Raja Akram. He reveals that he is the son of Lt. Col Mohd.Akhram Raja. At a function to honour the UN Peace Keeping Forces, Ajmal reveals that his father was killed in the Indo-Pakistani War of 1971. On hearing about this, Col. Mahadevan reveals that his father, Major Sahadevan, killed Ajmal's father.

The story shifts to 1971 when Bangladesh was fighting for independence from Pakistan. On 3 December 1971, Indian airfields are attacked in retaliation to which Indira Gandhi announces war. After the announcement, the entire army is rallied, and leaves are cancelled. The war starts when the Pakistan Army Armoured Corps attack Indian positions at the Basantar river. The Indians are not prepared and face a defeat. The Pakistani Army takes many POWs. The prisoners are tortured by the army men. At the same time, Raja notices this and reprimands his senior officer for violating the Geneva Convention which state that POWs should be treated like guests to which his senior officer is not happy.

Later, the Indians launch a full offensive against the Pakistanis in which one of their best tank commander Chinmay is martyred. On seeing Chinmay's face, Raja remarks that such a young boy had destroyed six tanks. He declares ceasefire to let the Indian Army collect the body. On seeing Chinmay's death, the Indian Army vows to take revenge. The Battle of Basantar begins with heavy casualties on both sides. In the end, Raja and Sahadevan face each other in a one on one battle, which is won by Sahadevan. At the same time, Pakistan surrenders unconditionally, and the ceasefire is declared. Sahadevan is disturbed by the deaths of the Indian soldiers and the Pakistani soldiers. He resolves that there should be no more wars as it leads to death and destruction.

Cast

 Mohanlal as Colonel Mahadevan and Major Sahadevan, later Brigadier (Major Hoshiar Singh Dahiya), The Grenadiers regiment 
 Arunoday Singh as Pak Lieutenant colonel Muhammed Akhram Raja sharif (Major Shabbir Sharif)
 Allu Sirish as Second Lieutenant Chinmay (Second Lieutenant Arun Khetarpal), Poona Horse regiment 
 Renji Panicker as Lieutenant Colonel Janardanan
 Deepak Jethi as Pak Colonel Ajmal raja (Akhram Raja's son)
 Asha Sarath as Parvathy Sahadevan, Major Sahadevan's wife and Colonel Mahadevan's mother
 Priyanka Agrawal as Sharif's wife
 Srushti Dange as Chinmay's wife
 Sudheer Karamana as Captain Aadhiselvam
 Jayakrishnan as Captain Anand
 Saiju Kurup as Gunner Nathan
 Padmaraj Ratheesh as Gunner Prayag
 Krishna Kumar as Havildar Sudharshan
 Manikuttan as Soldier
 Pradeep Chandran as Radio operator Abhinand
 Kannan Pattambi as Kunjikannan
 Devan as IB Director Nair IPS
 Souparnika Subhash as Nurse Fathima
 Neha Khan as Public Relations Officer
 Zoya Zayed Khan as Pakistani doctor
 Balaji Sarma as Sahadevan's friend
 Krishna Prasad as Sahadevan's friend
 Meghanathan as Sulaiman, Sahadevan's friend
 Kollam Thulasi as Sahadevan's friend
 Shaju Sreedhar as Chandru, Sahadevan's friend
 Manuraj as Geethanandhan, soldier
 Sudheer Sukumaran as Pakistan Maj.General Balukha Khan
 Vijayan Peringode as Krishna Pillai
 Sethu Lakshmi as Sahadevan's mother
 Saranya Anand as Military nurse
 Shone George as Soldier
 Tini Tom as soldier

Production

Development 

The film is set in two time periods, with Mohanlal playing both Colonel Mahadevan and his father Major Sahadevan (later brigadier) . The film will also see his transition from a Major to a Colonel. The film is based on a true incident and explores the friendship and life of two army officials. Mohanlal will be appearing in his fourth film as Mahadevan after Keerthi Chakra (2006), Kurukshetra (2008), and Kandahar (2010). Ravi said in an interview in October 2015, that unlike the previous films in the series, Beyond Borders will be more like his last military film Picket 43 (2015), that "the focus will be on the individuals rather than the war, and will portray the relationships that are forged during the war". Rahul Subramaniam, Siddharth Vipin, and Najim Arshad is composing the music for the film.

In early August 2016, Bollywood actor Arunoday Singh was confirmed playing the role of Lieutenant colonel (Lt. Col.) Rana Sharif, a soldier of Pakistan Army. Before zeroing in Singh, there were talks with other actors. Ravi was particularly looking for a Bollywood actor to play the role. Singh's character was modeled after a real life soldier in the Pakistan Frontier Force Regiment during the 1971 war. Ravi said, it is not a negative role that he is also fighting for his country and will have equal importance as Mahadevan. On 22 October 2016, Telugu actor Allu Sirish himself confirmed his role in the film by announcing in Twitter. He plays Lieutenant (Lt.) Chinmay, an armoured tank Commando, of the wing headed by Mahadevan. It is the Malayalam film debut of Sirish. Ravi was looking for younger actors to play the role. Mumbai-based model Priyanka Agrawal was signed to appear as Shariff's wife, in two different appearancesas a 65 year old and as her younger self. Hers is one among the two leading female roles in the film. It is also her feature film debut.

In early December 2016, it was confirmed that the production team negotiated with Nikki Galrani to play a Tamilian girl, a love interest of Chinmay, played by Sirish. She was busy with her Tamil films, but attracted as a Mohanlal film and the debut of Sirish, she agreed on verbal terms. Galrani later opted out from the film in early January 2017 due to a schedule change and conflicting date issues with some of her Tamil films in contract. Her portions opposite Sirish were supposed to be shot at Pollachi the same month. She was replaced by Srushti Dange, making her debut into Malayalam cinema. Zoya Zayed Khan was confirmed in December 2016, to play a traditional Pakistani doctor. She is acting alongside Singh. Khan was cast after a screen test. Shafeeq Rahman was cast as Jayakrishnan, one of the soldiers under Mahadevan's command. Saiju Kurup and Sudheer Karamana also plays soldiers, among others. Asha Sarath is paired opposite to Mohanlal's Sahadevan, the mother role of Mahadevan.

Filming 

The filming commenced on 31 October 2016 at Suratgarh in Rajasthan, India. Art director Saloo K. George built huge sets resembling army camps and bunkers. Built in Kochi, Kerala, they were transported to Rajasthan. The filming was conducted in the deserts of Rajasthan, the Viper population was highest in that area, the crew unaware of it first, immediately ordered antivenoms and worn heavy shoes on reaching the location. Chest congestion often occurred to the crew. Sirish joined filming on 5 November 2016. Indian army base in Arjungarh, Junagarh and Mahajan in Bikaner were some of the filming locations in Rajasthan. After 25 days of filming, the schedule was wrapped on 23 November 2016. There was also a schedule in Srinagar, Jammu and Kashmir.

The next few schedules underwent at various location in Kerala, beginning in Pattambi, Palakkad district. The Indo-Pakistani war sequences were planned to shoot at Uganda, later they decided to film it in Georgia instead, following the Kerala schedule. After finishing in Pattambi, they shifted to nearby Ottapalam in early January 2017. Then to Perumbavoor, Ernakulam district in the third week of January 2017, where sets were built resembling North Indian borders and warfare trenches. It was constructed in a 40 acre reclaimed land near Perumbavoor. Mohanlal joined the location on 16 January 2017, filming held during day and night.

The team began filming its final schedule in Georgia on 31 January 2017 for a week. Beyond Borders is the first Malayalam film to be shot in the Eurasian country. Major Mahadevan's action sequences were shot in Georgia who is in a UN peacekeeping mission. The filming wrapped on 5 February 2017.

Music 

The film will feature four songs composed by three music directorsNajim Arshad, Siddharth Vipin, and Rahul Subramanian. The film score is composed by Gopi Sunder. Singer Arshad debuts as a music director through the film. He composed a Hindi patriotic song written by a Kolkata-based lyricist named Kamal Karthik, the song come towards the end of the film. Vipin known for his compositions in Tamil films, is composing two songsone is a romantic song picturised in the locations in Kerala. The other one is a motivational song that will follow after a speech delivered by Mohanlal's character. Subramanian composed a nostalgic song, sung by M. G. Sreekumar and featuring Mohanlal and Asha Sarath.

Release 
1971: Beyond Borders released on 7 April 2017 in India. The Telugu dubbed version titled Yuddha Bhoomi (Battlefield) was released on 29 June 2018. The Tamil version was released later. The film released in its original version on 13 April 2017 in GCC countries. The television broadcast right of 1971: Beyond Borders was bought by Amrita TV for an amount of ₹5.5 crore.

See also
List of films about 1971 India-Pakistan war

References

External links
 
 

2017 films
2010s action war films
2017 war drama films
2010s historical action films
Indian action war films
Indian historical action films
Indian war drama films
2010s Malayalam-language films
Films about armoured warfare
Films set in 1971
Fiction about tanks
Films scored by Gopi Sundar
Films based on Indo-Pakistani wars and conflicts
Indo-Pakistani War of 1971
War films based on actual events
Films shot in Kochi
Films shot in Palakkad
Films shot in Ottapalam
Films shot in Rajasthan
Films shot in Punjab, India
Films shot in Georgia (country)
Indian Army in films
Military of Pakistan in films
Films directed by Major Ravi
2017 drama films
Historical action films
HMajor4
Films based on the Bangladesh Liberation War
Films set in East Pakistan